This is a list of earthquakes in Tonga:

Earthquakes

References 

Sources

Tonga
Earthquakes in Tonga
Earthquakes